Lutunia is a village in the Sabang CD block in  the Kharagpur subdivision of the Paschim Medinipur district in the state of West Bengal, India.

Geography

Location

Area overview
Kharagpur subdivision, shown partly in the map alongside, mostly has alluvial soils, except in two CD blocks in the west – Kharagpur I and Keshiary, which mostly have lateritic soils. Around 74% of the total cultivated area is cropped more than once. With a density of population of 787 per km2nearly half of the district’s population resides in this subdivision. 14.33% of the population lives in urban areas and 86.67% lives in the rural areas.

Note: The map alongside presents some of the notable locations in the subdivision. All places marked in the map are linked in the larger full screen map.

Demographics
According to the 2011 Census of India, Lutunia had a total population of 2,634 of which 1,326 (50%) were males and 1,308 (50%) were females. Population in the age range 0– 6 years was 274. The total number of literate persons in Lutunia was 2,072 (78.66% of the population over 6 years).

Transport
Lutunia is on the Egra-Patashpur-Temathani-Balichak-Debra Road. Harir Hat Road connects it to Sabang.

Education
Sabang Sajani Kanta Mahavidyalaya, established in 1970, is affiliated to Vidyasagar University. It offers honours courses in Bengali, English, economics, history, political science, philosophy and accountancy. It also offers general courses in arts, science and commerce The college owes its origin to a princely donation by Sajanikanta Giri.

References
	

Villages in Paschim Medinipur district